The Sea Toll Program (Indonesian: Tol Laut), sometimes called the Sea Highway Program, is a program initiated by Indonesian president Joko Widodo. Its aim is to reduce price disparity between the main islands of Indonesia and smaller isolated islands, especially those in East Indonesia. It was launched in 2015, and has legal basis under Presidential Decree Number 106 of 2015 & Decree from Ministry of Transportation Number 4 of 2016. The program consists of the construction of new container ports in smaller regions and regularly scheduled highly subsidized ship routes from main ports of Indonesia to smaller and more isolated ports.

Background 
Due to Indonesia's geography, smaller isolated islands have long lacked the infrastructure necessary for the distribution of resources. As a result, these islands lack availability of basic goods, with prices correspondingly higher than on the main islands of Java, Sumatra and Borneo.

A specialized logistical system for Indonesia was first proposed during the Yudhoyono presidency, but was never fully carried out. Joko Widodo proposed his vision of developing Indonesia from the "periphery", emphasizing that the country should pay more attention to developing and isolated regions that are often neglected. During the 2014 presidential debate, he proposed his vision called "Nawacita", a 9-point strategy which included a plan to even out development between periphery, border, and isolated areas, and the big cities of Indonesia. This included reduction of price disparities, inclusive economic development, and greater availability of goods and transportation for those that live in Indonesia's periphery regions. Additionally, he wanted to strengthen Indonesia's identity as a maritime nation.

In 2015, Widodo made a speech proposing the Sea Toll Program to reduce the price disparity of goods, especially within small islands and border regions. The program was subsequently established in the same year with three initial shipping routes.

Ship classes 

Most ships used in this program were purpose-built under the order of the government. Most of the ships are named by its class name followed by order of construction. There are six classes of ships operated under this program. In 2020 there were 116 pioneer ships, 14 container ships, 6 cattle ships, 18 open deck ships, and 138 people's ships.

Cattle ship (Camara Nusantara class) 

Cattle ship (Indonesian: Kapal ternak) is a type of ship used to transport live cattle such as cows, pigs, and goats. This particular ship has widespread use and regular routes to and from West and East Nusa Tenggara. Both provinces have significant cattle populations and industries. This particular type of ship is also equipped with facilities to feed the cattle, cattle pens, veterinarian clinics. and animal quarantine facilities. Each ship is usually capable of carrying up to 500 cows.

Main container ship (Logistik Nusantara class) 

Main container ships are container ships that are capable of carrying up to 100 Twenty-foot Equivalent Units. The minimum docking pier length for this ship is 100m. These are mother ships in the program, usually incapable of reaching smaller ports, which mostly operate between base ports. Because of that, these ships are assisted by feeder ships.

Feeder ship (Kendhaga Nusantara class) 

Feeder ships, or sometimes called connector ships (Indonesian: Kapal penghubung) are smaller versions of main container ships. They also carry fewer and smaller containers.

Pioneer ship (Sabuk Nusantara class) 

Pioneer ships are ships that serve small routes that still have little-to-no commercial value. They carry goods and transport people. They are also used to transport goods from smaller ports to bigger ports and vice versa. These ships are capable of carrying up to around 250-500 people and goods between 200 and 400 tons at the same time.

Open deck ship (Gandha Nusantara class) 
Open deck ships (Indonesian: Kapal rede) are ships specifically built with open deck and open ramp door. Generally similar in size than pioneer ships, they also transport people and goods at the same time. Open deck ships are also used for tourism.

People's ship (Banawa Nusantara class) 
This type of ship usually consist of small boats donated by locals or organizations and operated by local governments. They mostly serve to connect small islands and transport people on a small scale.

Routes 
Since 2015, the number of routes has been expanded from 3 to over 26 routes, serving more than 100 ports. Around 50 new ports have also been constructed and the fleet specifically assigned to this program was 293 units in 2020. In 2021, 4 new routes were announced making the total 30 routes. Routes started from base ports (pangkalan) and main container ports in the region before continuing to smaller ports, and then taking the same route back. In 2023, the total routes operational were 39 routes operated both by state-owned companies and private partnerships. Table below shows information about routes as of 2022.

Effect 
In 2017, an analysis showed a positive impact in the form of a decrease in the price index value chart for price commodities, namely cooking oil by an average of 4.652% and beef by an average of 4.85%. In East Nusa Tenggara, cement price decreased more than 50% per sack in the same year. In Rote Ndao Regency, an average decrease of 11-20% of grocery prices such as chicken meat, cooking oil, egg, and rice. In Tidore and Fakfak Regency, the price of basic goods decreased by 14% and 10% respectively. Pelni, a national shipping company, saw return freight increase by 147% in 2020, potentially creating new business opportunities for entrepreneurs and businesses from isolated regions. In 2017, the price of frozen chicken on the island of Morotai decreased from Rp 40,000 to Rp 34,000. On the same year in Merauke, price of wheat flour decreased from Rp 185,000 per 25 kilograms down to Rp 172,000. In 2018, it was noted that the program decreases reliance of border regions in Kalimantan on Malaysian products as much as 20%. On Natuna Regency, price of clothes decreased as much as 45% and price of salt on North Halmahera Regency decreased 50% per kilogram. It is noted that majority of requested to isolated regions and smaller ports are basic goods such as cooking oil, rice, or sugar, in addition to steel for construction. At the same time, majority of return freights are fishery products, forest products, and copra.

Nationally, it is estimated on average the program decreased basic goods and grocery prices as much as 30%.

Criticism 
The program was criticized for several reasons. One of them is that the program did not help Indonesia's shipping industry. While the majority of ships were constructed in Indonesia, around 60-75% of ship components were still imported as of 2018. Local dockyards were also rarely utilized for reparation and maintenance, in addition of newly constructed ship only 10% utilizes local dockyards. In maintenance and repairing, 80% of repairing and maintenance requests were from state-operated ships showing a lack of business by private shipping countries.

According to Minister of Transportation, Budi Karya Sumadi, while the program reduced overall prices and logistical cost, Indonesia still has more expensive logistics compared to neighbouring regions such as Japan and China. World Bank data in 2018 revealed that transporting a container from Jakarta to Singapore, Hong Kong, Bangkok, and Shanghai cost between $100–200 while cost of transporting from Jakarta to Padang, Medan, Banjarmasin, and Makassar still costs more than $1,400.

Another criticism is that the number of ports utilized are still small. As of 2017, only 97 out of 570 operational ports were used by the program. Indonesia's Shipping Connectivity Index is rank 36 out of 178 countries. While improving, this is still far from neighbouring country such as Malaysia and Vietnam with respective ranks of 5 and 19.

Lack of return freight is also criticized. Local entrepreneurs and businesses from destination ports are not using the program to tap into the city market. In 2020, return freight size was only 34% of goods delivered. In response, the Ministry of Transportation formed a special team to address the issue and increase return freight. Indonesian economist Faisal Basri criticized the program for only benefiting traders and businesses that have control over ports.

References 

Economy of Indonesia
Water transport in Indonesia